Stipić is a Serbo-Croatian family name, a patronymic of Stipe. Notable people with this name include:

 Milan Stipić (1978), Croatian Greek Catholic hierarch
 Nikola Stipić (1937), former Serbian footballer
 Tomislav Stipić (1979), Croatian-German professional football manager

References 

Croatian surnames
Serbian surnames